The Battle of Rio Hato Airfield took place during the U.S invasion of Panama and was fought between the U.S military and the Panamanian Defense Force (PDF). On 20 December US paratroopers launched a surprise attack against the Panamanian Army at Rio Hato, the largest PDF military base, approximately seventy miles south of Panama City. 

The objective of the attack was to capture the PDF garrison at the base, secure the airfield runway, and seize Manuel Noriega's beachside house.

The Battle

At H-hour two F-117A stealth fighter-bombers delivered two 2,000-lb. precision bombs in an attempt to stun and confuse the PDF garrison of two heavily armed infantry companies defending the airfield. Instead of landing at their targets both bombs set off nearby waking the garrison. The PDF 6th and 7th Rifle companies numbered at 520 troops in all. In addition to this the 7th company was known to be a "part of Noriega's best trained and most loyal forces".

Thirteen C-130 Hercules transport aircraft, having flown nonstop from the United States, parachuted in the entire battalion of 2/75 Rangers & 1 company from 3/75 Rangers, with the remainder of 3/75 going to Howard AFB in reserve as a reactionary force. The jump was conducted from a dangerously low altitude of 490 feet. This due to intelligence stating the Panamanian anti-aircraft weaponry could not track accurately below 500 feet. Regardless, 11 of the 13 aircraft were hit by 23mm anti-aircraft fire. The faster than normal air speed of 170 knots and the low altitude contributed to the several dozen that were injured while landing. Multiple Rangers were also wounded by ground fire coming through the aircraft. Several more wounded while under canopy also from ground fire. At least 1 Ranger was killed and 1 paralyzed when their static lines were cut from AA fire. Gathering quickly in the darkness, two companies of Rangers fanned out to isolate the airfield, cut the Pan-American Highway running through it, and seize a nearby ammunition dump.

2 (possibly more) military trucks filled with PDF soldiers drove down the runway and adjacent dirt road raking the wounded and assembling Rangers with small arms & .50 BMG fire. These were dispatched by a Ranger platoon sergeant from 3/75 with a LAW rocket; a noncommissioned officer from A-2/75 fired on a truck with a 1911 .45 caliber pistol and inadvertently hit the gas tank exploding said vehicle.

Meanwhile, another company attacked a nearby NCO academy complex and yet another struck the two PDF companies deployed to defend the airfield. The fighting turned into a ferocious exchange of fire with the ground fire of the rangers heavily reinforced by support from an AC-130 "Spectre" gunship and several attack helicopters. 

The contested buildings fell in room-to-room fighting following a liberal use of grenades and automatic rifles at close ranges. The Battle of Rio Hato Airfield in total went on for roughly five hours by which time the rangers had secured Rio Hato, as well as Noriega’s lavish beach house nearby.

At least 1 APC engaged Rangers on the west end of the airfield. It was dispatched by Rangers firing LAW rockets and fire from AC-130 Spectre gunship simultaneously.

However, in one case of mistaken identity, a US attack helicopter mistook a squad of rangers for a group of PDF and fired, killing two rangers and wounding four rangers.

Casualties
The U.S military lost 4 killed, 18 wounded, and 26 injured in the jump. At Rio Hato, the PDF lost 34 soldiers killed, 362 captured, and a huge inventory of weapons abandoned. Around 200 PDF soldiers managed to flee into the countryside and evade capture.

References 

Rio Hato Airfield
History of Panama
Rio Hato Airfield
Rio Hato Airfield
Operations involving American special forces
Operations against organized crime
1989 in Panama
United States invasion of Panama
December 1989 events in North America